The 2015–16 Indiana Hoosiers men's basketball team represented Indiana University in the 2015–16 NCAA Division I men's basketball season. Their head coach was Tom Crean, who was in his eighth season with the Hoosiers. The team played its home games at Assembly Hall in Bloomington, Indiana, as a member of the Big Ten Conference.

This season marked the 40th Anniversary of the 32–0 and National Championship 1975–76 Hoosiers team, a feat still unrivaled. To commemorate the anniversary, players' jerseys featured a commemorative patch on the back of the jersey. The Hoosiers also held a public recognition of the undefeated team during halftime of the home game against Wisconsin on January 5, during which the announcement was made that a statue of the seniors and starters will be erected outside the south entrance of Assembly Hall. A new banner was also revealed honoring the '76 team as NCAA's #1 All-Time March Madness Team. Tom Abernethy and Bobby Wilkerson, two players from the team, were inducted into the IU Athletics Hall of Fame.

IU's season-opener victory against Eastern Illinois was a milestone game, as it marked 1,000 home wins in Indiana basketball history. IU finished the regular season by winning their 22nd conference title, tying them with in-state rival, Purdue, for the most conference titles.

Indiana finished the season 27–8 overall, 15–3 in the Big Ten to win the Big Ten regular season title outright. They received the #1 seed in the 2016 Big Ten men's basketball tournament, where they made an early Quarterfinals exit by losing to Michigan. The Hoosiers received an at-large bid to the NCAA tournament. Indiana defeated Chattanooga and Kentucky to advance to the Sweet Sixteen for the third time in five years; however, in the Sweet Sixteen they fell to the North Carolina Tar Heels, 86–101.

Previous season
The 2014–15 Hoosiers went 20–14 overall and 9–9 in the Big Ten Conference (tying for seventh place). Much of the Hoosiers' difficulties were caused by a lack of defense and post presence. The Hoosiers improved over the 13–14 season, in which they did not appear in any postseason tournament, by being selected to play in the NCAA Tournament as a #10 seed in the Midwest region. They made an early exit as the #7 Wichita State Shockers knocked them off in the second round.

Following the season, assistant coach Steve McClain was hired as the new head coach at the University of Illinois-Chicago. Tom Crean named Rob Judson, who spent the 2014–15 season as Indiana's Director of Basketball Operations, as McClain's replacement.

Preseason

Departures

Recruiting class

On April 4, 2015, McDonald's All-American and Jordan Brand All-Star, Thomas Bryant  committed to IU. With this commit, IU landed their fifth McDonald's All-American in a row, as well as secured a 6'10" rim-protector, which was something drastically missing from the previous season. Bryant made the announcement live on ESPN during the Dick's National Tournament.

In addition to the three high school recruits, Indiana received a commitment from Michigan graduate transfer Max Bielfeldt. The senior forward is eligible immediately to play for the Hoosiers.

A late addition of junior Pittsburgh transfer, Josh Newkirk, filled IU's last 2015–16 scholarship. Due to transfer rules and rehabilitating a knee injury from May, Newkirk will sit out the '15–'16 season. He will have two remaining seasons of eligibility left.

Roster

Schedule

|-
!colspan=12 style="background:#7D110C; color:white;"| Exhibition

|-
!colspan=12 style="background:#7D110C; color:white;"| Non-conference regular season

|-
!colspan=12 style="background:#7D110C; color:white;"| Big Ten regular season

|-
!colspan=12 style="background:#7D110C; color:white;"| Big Ten tournament

|-
!colspan=12 style="background:#7D110C; color:white;"| NCAA tournament

Player statistics

Rankings

See also
2015–16 Indiana Hoosiers women's basketball team

References

Indiana Hoosiers men's basketball seasons
Indiana
Indiana
2015 in sports in Indiana
2016 in sports in Indiana